Bruno Hofer (15 December 1861 – 7 July 1916) was a German fishery scientist, credited with being the founder of fish pathology.

Career
Hofer was born in Rhein in East Prussia (now Poland) in 1861. He studied natural sciences at the University of Königsberg, receiving his doctorate in 1887 in Munich as a student of Richard Hertwig. He then worked as an assistant at the Zoological Institute of Munich, and in 1889 obtained his habilitation. He obtained a position at the Zoological Institute as a university lecturer and in 1891 acquired citizenship of the Kingdom of Bavaria. In 1894 he was appointed as a curator of the Zoologischen Sammlung des Staates, and two years later became a lecturer for ichthyology at the veterinary university of Munich. In 1898 he was awarded an associate professorship for zoology and ichthyology and the chair of a full professor in 1904.

During his career, he was also director of the "Royal Bavarian Research Station for Fisheries"  and the "Royal Bavarian Research Station for Fish-Farming", vice-president of the "Bavarian Association of Fishermen" and editor of the magazine "Allgemeine Fischereizeitung". In 1909 he circumscribed the whitefish species Coregonus bavaricus. Hofer died in 1916 in Munich at the age of 54.

Publications
Hofer was particularly active in the field of fish parasitology and pathology, and wrote the comprehensive German text on the subject, Fischkrankheitslehre (fish pathology), as well as his "Handbuch der Fischkrankheiten" (1904), "Die Süßwasserfische von Mitteleuropas" (1908), "Über die Krebspest" (1898), and more than 200 publications. In 1896 he was the author of a limnologic study of Lake Constance, titled "Die Verbreitung der Thierwelt im Bodensee" (The spread of wildlife in Lake Constance). One of his most significant publications was the taxonomic description of the myxosporean parasite, Myxobolus cerebralis. Hofer is also known for his early work in environmental protection, in particular for the preservation of water quality and drinking-water resources.

References
Götz, Sabine (1998): "Bruno Hofer (1861–1916), a life for fisheries and environmental protection." Munich, Univ. of Munich, 268p.

External links
 
Dissertation's abstract about Hofer

1861 births
1916 deaths
German parasitologists
Fisheries scientists
Academic staff of the Ludwig Maximilian University of Munich
University of Königsberg alumni
People from the Province of Prussia
People from Ryn
German curators
German ichthyologists
19th-century German zoologists